Kanavu is a 1954 Indian Tamil-language film directed by P. V. Krishnan. The film stars G. Muthukrishnan and Lalitha.

Cast
List adapted from the database of Film News Anandan.

Male cast
Valayapathi G. Muthukrishnan
V. K. Ramasamy
R. Balasubramaniam
S. S. Sivasooriyan
V. Selvam

Female cast
Lalitha
Pollachi Kamala
M. K. Lakshmi
A. Shanthi

Production
The film was produced and directed by P. V. Krishnan under the banner K. R. K. Productions. M. B. Chellappan Nair wrote the story while K. Devanarayanan and A. S. Rajagopal wrote the dialogues. Cinematography was handled by N. C. Balakrishnan and editing was done by V. S. Rajan. Ammaiyappan was in charge of art direction. Hiralal, Kumar and Balaraman handled the choreography. Still photography was done by Venkatachary. The film was processed at Vikram laboratory.

Soundtrack
Music was composed by G. Ramanathan and V. Dakshinamoorthy while the lyrics were penned by A. Maruthakasi and A. S. Rajagopal. Playback singers are M. L. Vasanthakumari, Jikki, Soolamangalam Rajalakshmi, Sundari, Seetha, Padma, Rajamani, Sarojini, Rajalakshmi, Kanthamani and V. P. Balaraman.

References

Indian drama films
Films scored by G. Ramanathan
Films scored by V. Dakshinamoorthy
1950s Tamil-language films
1954 drama films
1954 films